Santan Rodrigues (died 14 July 2006) was a Bombay (Mumbai)-based poet writing in English. He is rated as one of the prominent poets who has written in the language from Western India.

Literary output
According to WorldCat Identities, as an author and editor, Rodrigues has produced four works in eleven publications in the English language and his literary production can be found in 62 library holdings.

Critical evaluation
Rodrigues has been praised by other prominent poets from the area, as in this tribute in the Mumbai Mirror on his first death anniversary:

Books authored
His published works include:
 The Youseholder Yogi, Life of Shri Yogendra (Book, published in five editions between 1982 and 2008)
 Nissim Ezekiel Remembered (Book, published in two editions in 2008)
 I Exist: Poems, 1970-1972 (Book, two editions published in 1976)
 Three Poets (Book, two editions published in 1978)

References

External links
Santan Rodrigues, on WorldCat Identities
Remembering Santan (by Eunice de Souza)
Varnamala:Indian English Poetry (an example of Rodrigues' verse)

Writers from Mumbai